Robert Corkey  (1881 – 26 January 1966) was a Presbyterian minister, a professor of theology and a Unionist politician in Northern Ireland.

Biography

He was born at Glendermott Parish, Waterside, Derry, the son of Rev. Dr Joseph Corkey. He was educated at Foyle College, Magee College, Queen’s College, Belfast, the University of Edinburgh and Trinity College, Dublin. He was a Minister of the Presbyterian Church in Ireland at Ballygawley from 1906 to 1910 and Monaghan from 1910 to 1917; and then Professor of Ethics and Practical Theology at Assembly's College, Belfast from 1917 to 1951. He was Moderator of the General Assembly of the Presbyterian Church of Ireland from 1945 to 1946.

He was elected to the House of Commons of Northern Ireland from the Queen's University seat in 1929, and represented the University until his resignation on election to the Senate in 1943 (in which he served until 1965). He served as Assistant Parliamentary Secretary to the Ministry of Finance and Assistant Whip from 1942 to 1943. He served in Sir Basil Brooke's Cabinet as Minister of Education from 1943 to 1944, joining the Privy Council (Northern Ireland) on his promotion. He was Deputy Speaker of the Senate from 1952 to 1953 and from 1957 to 1958. He died on 26 January 1966.

References

External links
 

1881 births
1966 deaths
Members of the House of Commons of Northern Ireland 1929–1933
Members of the House of Commons of Northern Ireland 1933–1938
Members of the House of Commons of Northern Ireland 1938–1945
Members of the Privy Council of Northern Ireland
Members of the Senate of Northern Ireland 1941–1945
Members of the Senate of Northern Ireland 1945–1949
Members of the Senate of Northern Ireland 1949–1953
Members of the Senate of Northern Ireland 1953–1957
Members of the Senate of Northern Ireland 1957–1961
Members of the Senate of Northern Ireland 1961–1965
Northern Ireland Cabinet ministers (Parliament of Northern Ireland)
Northern Ireland junior government ministers (Parliament of Northern Ireland)
Ulster Unionist Party members of the House of Commons of Northern Ireland
Alumni of Queen's University Belfast
Alumni of the University of Edinburgh
Alumni of Trinity College Dublin
Presbyterian ministers from Northern Ireland
People educated at Foyle College
Date of birth missing
Place of death missing
Moderators of the Presbyterian Church in Ireland
Members of the House of Commons of Northern Ireland for Queen's University of Belfast
Ulster Unionist Party members of the Senate of Northern Ireland